Sigmund Schenkling (11 July 1865, in Laucha an der Unstrut – 16 December 1946, in Eisleben) was a German entomologist who specialised in Coleoptera. 

Schenkling's collection is held by the German Entomological Institute. It is notable for Cleridae, Erotylidae, Languriidae, Helotidae and Endomychidae the families he specialised in

Works
Major works only. 
1928-1929. With Walther Hermann Richard Horn Index Litteratuae Entomologicae Horn, Berlin-Dahlem.A bibliography of entomology,covering the early printed works on entomology through to 1900 and describing over 25,000 printed items.
As editor the multi-authored and multi-volumed Coleopterorum Catalogus. W. Junk,Berlin.

References
Rohlfien, K. 1994 [Schenkling, S.] Studia dipterologica 1(1) 9-10.

External links
 
 Index Novus Litteraturae Entomologicae Completely revised new edition of the "Index Litteraturae Entomologicae'' Bibliography of the literature on entomology from the beginning until 1863

German entomologists
1865 births
1946 deaths